N-Ethylbuphedrone (also known as NEB) is a stimulant of the cathinone class that has been sold as a designer drug. It is the β-ketone analogue of N,alpha-diethylphenylethylamine.

Legal status

As of October 2015 NEB is a controlled substance in China.

In the United States NEB is considered a schedule 1 controlled substance as a positional isomer of 4-Methylethcathinone (4-MEC)

See also 

 4-Methylbuphedrone
 4-Methylethcathinone
 Buphedrone
 Ethcathinone
 Etilamfetamine
 N-Ethylpentedrone
 N-Ethylhexedrone
 N-Ethylheptedrone

References 

Stimulants
Cathinones
Designer drugs
Norepinephrine-dopamine releasing agents